An overview of South African police decorations and medals, which form part of the South African honours system.

South African Police 

The South African Police was established in 1913 as a national police force.  It had a secondary military role, which came to the fore in World War I and again in World War II.

1923-1963 

The SAP was eligible for the British King's Police Medal, which was awarded annually throughout the British Empire.  This was discontinued in 1933, because South Africa had become independent as a member of the new British Commonwealth, and it was replaced in 1937 by a special South African issue of the medal.  From 1923, the SAP also had its own long service medal, which doubled as a medal for gallantry.  The medals available to the SAP between 1923 and 1963 were thus:

Decoration 

 Queen's Police Medal (South Africa) (1937–61)

Campaign medal

Long service medal 

 Police Good Service Medal (1923–63)

Until 1952, they were incorporated into the British honours system.  Thereafter they formed part of the new South African honours system.

1963-2003 

After South Africa became a republic (in 1961), the government instituted an entirely new series of decorations and medals for the SAP.  It was added to several times over the years:

Decorations

Campaign medal

Commemorative medals

Long service medals

 
 
 

In 1994, the SAP amalgamated with the police forces of the former "homelands" inside South Africa, to form the South African Police Service.

South African Railways Police

1934-1966 

The South African Railways Police was established in 1934, to police the country's railways and harbours.  It was later responsible for air services too.  The SARP was modeled on the SAP, and shared the King's/Queen's Police Medal with it.  It also had its own long service medal:  the Railways Police Good Service Medal (1934–66).

1966-1986 

An entirely new series of decorations and medals was instituted for the SARP in 1966, to match those established for the SAP in 1963.  The series was enlarged in 1980, to correspond to the changes made to the SAP awards in 1979.  The full range of honours was:

Decorations

Campaign medal

Long service medals 

 
 
 
 

The SARP was amalgamated into the SA Police on 1 October 1986, with all its personnel, assets and equipment transferred to the SAP.

South African Police Service 

The South African Police Service, which was formed in 1994 by amalgamating the SAP and the police forces of the former homelands, used the SAP decorations and medals until 2004, when a new series of decorations was instituted:

Decorations

Commemorative medal 

 
 
 2013 - Centenary Medal - South African Police Service - "Celebrating 100 years of policing 1913-2013"

Long service medals

Animal decoration

Municipal/Metropolitan Police Service 

In 1998, the municipal and metropolitan council police forces were brought under the auspices of the SA Police Service Act, and became collectively known as the Municipal/Metropolitan Police Service.  A series of decorations and medals was instituted for them in 2008.

Decorations

Commemorative Medal

Long service medals

Animal decoration

Notes

References

See also 

 British and Commonwealth orders and decorations
 South African civil honours
 South African intelligence service decorations
 South African military decorations
 South African orders and decorations
 South African prisons decorations

External links

 

Police decorations and medals of South Africa
Law enforcement awards and honors
South Africa and the Commonwealth of Nations